Robin Wagner (born December 15, 1957) is an American figure skating coach. She was a competitive skater in the late-1970s and competed at the United States Figure Skating Championships at the Novice and Junior levels. She trained with Sonia Dunfield, Peter Dunfield, and Gustav Lussi.

After retiring from competitive skating, Wagner graduated from Barnard College (1980) with a degree in Psychology. She performed with Ice Theatre of New York and became a figure skating coach and choreographer.

Her former students include Sasha Cohen, Silvia Fontana, Elene Gedevanishvili, Sarah Hughes, and Rohene Ward.

Wagner is on the Advisory Board of Figure Skating in Harlem, a non-profit organization based in New York City that provides educational and athletic opportunities for girls.

Results

References

1957 births
Living people
American female single skaters
American figure skating coaches
Female sports coaches
Barnard College alumni
21st-century American women